Qaramanlı (also, Garamanly and Garamanli) is a village and municipality in the Yevlakh District of Azerbaijan. It has a population of 2,230. The municipality consists of the villages of Garamanly, Hajymahmudlu, Dəlləklər, Köyük, Nəmirli, and Nurulular.

References 

Populated places in Yevlakh District